Tomás Carlos Figueroa (born 20 April 1995) is an Argentine professional footballer who plays as a goalkeeper for Ituzaingó.

Career
Figueroa, after joining their academy from Villa Luro Norte, started out with Vélez Sarsfield, with manager Miguel Ángel Russo promoting him into their senior set-up during the 2015 Primera División. In four seasons, he was an unused substitute on eleven occasions - six times in the aforementioned campaign, with the other five arriving in 2016–17. On 30 July 2018, Figueroa completed a loan move to Primera B Metropolitana side Deportivo Español. He made his professional bow with the club in February 2019, featuring for the full duration of a goalless draw with Tristán Suárez.

In September 2020, Figueroa joined Primera C Metropolitana club Ituzaingó. Figueroa helped Ituzaingó with promotion to Primera B Metropolitana for the 2022 season, after a match against Argentino de Merlo that ended in a penalty shootout, where Figueroa's saves sent the team up to Argentina's third best tier.

Personal life
In April 2016, Figueroa contracted dengue virus. He was isolated at home to avoid contagion, before returning to training with Vélez Sarsfield.

Career statistics
.

References

External links

1995 births
Living people
Footballers from Buenos Aires
Argentine footballers
Association football goalkeepers
Primera B Metropolitana players
Primera C Metropolitana players
Club Atlético Vélez Sarsfield footballers
Deportivo Español footballers
Club Atlético Ituzaingó players